New England Highway is an  long highway in Australia running from Yarraman, north of Toowoomba, Queensland at its northern end to Hexham at Newcastle, New South Wales at its southern end. It is part of Australia's National Highway system, and forms part of the inland route between Brisbane and Sydney.

Route
At its northern end New England Highway connects to D'Aguilar Highway, and at its southern end it connects to Pacific Highway. It traverses the Darling Downs, New England, and Hunter Valley regions.

During the winter months, some parts of the New England Highway are subject to frost and snowfall, with the 350 km section from the Moonbi Ranges to Stanthorpe located at high altitudes.

Traffic volume
In 2013–14, the New England and Cunningham Highways combined (known as the Sydney-Brisbane inland route) had an average annual daily traffic count of just over 13,000 vehicles, which is approximately half that seen on the coastal route (i.e., the Pacific Highway and Pacific Motorway). Heavy vehicles account for approximately 13% of the traffic seen on the route.

Speed cameras
As of November 2018, fixed speed cameras were located at Ben Lomond (between Ross Road and Ben Lomond Road), Blandford (between Hayles Street and Mills Street) and Tenterfield (between Duncan Street and George Street). Average speed enforcement (point-to-point) cameras target heavy vehicles between Singleton and Muswellbrook.

History
New England Highway has its origins in the track which developed north from Newcastle to reach the prime wool growing areas of the New England region which Europeans settled following expeditions by NSW Surveyor-General John Oxley in 1818 and botanist Allan Cunningham in 1827 and 1829. The rough track, navigable only by horse or bullock dray, crossed the Liverpool Range, went through Tamworth and ended at Tenterfield. The track became known as the Great Northern Road. During the 1860s, several robberies occurred along the road, with infamous bushranger Captain Thunderbolt known to be active in the area.

The passing of the Main Roads Act of 1924 through the Parliament of New South Wales provided for the declaration of Main Roads, roads partially funded by the State government through the Main Roads Board (later the Department of Main Roads, and eventually Transport for NSW). Great Northern Highway was declared (as Main Road No. 9) on 8 August 1928, replacing the Great Northern Road and running from North Sydney via Hornsby, Peat's Ferry, Gosford, Swansea, Newcastle, Maitland, Singleton, Tamworth, Armidale, Glen Innes, Tenterfield and Woodenbong to the border with Queensland; with the passing of the Main Roads (Amendment) Act of 1929 to provide for additional declarations of State Highways and Trunk Roads, this was amended to State Highway 9 on 8 April 1929.

The section of Great Northern Highway between Sydney and Hexham was subsumed into Pacific Highway on 26 May 1931; the southern end of Great Northern Highway was truncated at the intersection with Pacific Highway at Hexham as a result. The remaining portion from Hexham to Brisbane was later renamed New England Highway, through Queensland on 14 February 1933, and a month later through New South Wales on 14 March 1933. In 1936 the road was described by contemporary observers as being in good condition, with spectacular scenery and excellent accommodation en route.

The Department of Main Roads, which had succeeded the New South Wales MRB in 1932, declared Main Road 374 on 16 March 1938, from the intersection with Tenterfield-Yetman Road (later Bruxner Highway) just north of Tenterfield to the state border with Queensland at Wallangarra; this was replaced with the declaration of State Highway 24 along the same route on 11 January 1950.

New England Highway was re-routed through Warwick along the route that was then known in Queensland as the Lockyer-Darling Downs Highway on 11 August 1954, with the new alignment of State Highway 9 subsuming State Highway 24 in New South Wales. Against the wishes of the Beaudesert Shire Council and the Woodenbong Chamber of Commerce, the former alignment of New England Highway through Beaudesert was renamed Mount Lindesay Highway, and the New South Wales section was re-declared as State Highway 24 (this was eventually revoked on 23 December 1981 and re-declared as Main Road 622).

In the 1970s, the Queensland Main Roads Department rerouted the designation of the New England Highway north of Warwick to follow the former Lockyer-Darling Downs Highway (national route 17) so that it terminated in Toowoomba. The section of the highway between Brisbane and Warwick was renamed as part of Cunningham Highway, which until that time had extended only westward from Warwick to Goondiwindi.

The passing of the Roads Act of 1993 through the Parliament of New South Wales updated road classifications and the way they could be declared within New South Wales. Under this act, New England Highway today retains its declaration as Highway 9, from Hexham to the state border with Queensland.

New England Highway was signed National Route 15 from Warwick to Hexham in 1955. The Whitlam Government introduced the federal National Roads Act 1974, where roads declared as a National Highway were still the responsibility of the states for road construction and maintenance, but were fully compensated by the Federal government for money spent on approved projects. As an important interstate link between the capitals of Queensland and New South Wales, New England Highway was declared a National Highway in 1974 and was consequently re-signed as National Highway 15. National Route 42 was extended north along New England Highway from Warwick to Toowoomba; State Route 85 was allocated sometime during the 1980s between Toowoomba and Hampton, and State Route 61 allocated sometime during the 1990s between Hampton and its northern terminus at Yarraman. National Highway 15 was later truncated at its southern end from Hexham to Beresfield in 1988, as the Mandalong-Freemans Waterhole stage of Sydney-Newcastle Freeway opened and National Highway 1 was rerouted via existing arterial routes to Beresfield, then along New England Highway to Hexham, before resuming its original route north along Pacific Highway.

With Queensland's conversion to the newer alphanumeric system in 2005, National Route 42 and State Route 61 were removed and replaced by route A3 between Yarraman and Warwick, now running concurrent with State Route 85 between Hampton and Toowoomba, and National Highway 15 was updated to route A15 between Warwick and the state border with New South Wales. New South Wales' conversion to the newer alphanumeric system occurred later in 2013, with National Highway 15 also updated to route A15 from the state border with Queensland to Hexham. With Hunter Expressway opening a year later in 2014, route A15 was modified to route M15 and rerouted along it east of Branxton, and route A43 was extended westwards from Hexham along New England Highway to replace it, retaining a concurrency with route A1 between Beresfield and Hexham.

Highway improvements
As of July 2021, completed, current or proposed improvements on the New England Highway include:
Belford to the Golden Highway. Construction contract for this $97 million project awarded June 2021.
Bolivia Hill
Bridge barrier improvements to four bridges between Ravensworth and Liddell. Work commenced July 2021.
Fitzgerald Bridge at Aberdeen
Maitland roundabout improvements. $4.9 million project nearing completion.
Muswellbrook bypass. Community feedback on the preferred option is to be sought in 2021.
New England Highway draft corridor strategy
New England Highway and Wyndella Road intersection, Lochinvar
Safety improvements Whittingham. Work commenced April 2021.
Safety upgrade Willow Tree To Uralla. Work commenced at Kootingal January 2021.
Scone bypass. See below.
Singleton rail underpass. See below.
Singleton bypass. In April 2021 community feedback was incorporated into this $700 million project.
Tenterfield heavy vehicle bypass

Scone bypass
The Scone Bypass was opened in March 2020. In addition to bypassing the town centre, it also replaces the last railway level crossing on the New England Highway.

Singleton rail underpass
The New England Highway upgrade and rail bridge replacement at Singleton (known as Gowrie Gates) was opened in July 2019. This upgrade is not part of the proposed Singleton bypass.

Roads of Strategic Importance upgrades
The Roads of Strategic Importance initiative, last updated in March 2022, includes the following projects for the New England Highway in Queensland.

Road upgrades
A project to upgrade the New England Highway at Cabarlah, at an estimated cost of $5 million, was in planning at March 2022.

Emu Swamp Dam supporting infrastructure
A project to develop supporting road infrastructure for the Emu Swamp Dam, adjacent to the New England Highway at Stanthorpe, at a cost of $6.3 million is planned to be completed by mid-2023.

Other upgrades in Queensland

Intersection upgrade
A project to upgrade the intersection with the Cunningham Highway east of Warwick, at a cost of $25 million, was due for completion in August 2022.

Improvement planning
Two projects to develop business cases for improvements to the highway south of Toowoomba, at a cost of $650,000, were to be completed by March 2022.

Safety improvements
A project to improve safety between Stanthorpe and Ballandean, at a cost of $19.4 million, was ongoing in July 2022.

Turning lanes at Cabarlah
A project to construct turning lanes at Cabarlah, at a cost of $600,000, was in the planning stage in July 2022.

Upgrade planning Warwick to Stanthorpe
A project to plan for upgrades between Warwick and Stanthorpe, at a coat of $450,000, was completed in October 2021.

Pavement widening near Cooyar
A project to deliver widened pavement near Cooyar, at a cost of $24.576 million, was to finish by July 2022.

Former route allocations
New England Highway has had many former route allocations including former National Route 15. Where and when the former route numbers were implemented are stated below.

Yarraman – Hampton:
 State Route 61 
 A3 
Hampton – Toowoomba:
 State Route 85 
 A3 
Toowoomba – Warwick:
 National Route 42 
 A3 
Warwick – QLD/NSW border:
 National Route 15 
 National Highway 15 
 A15 
QLD/NSW border – Branxton:
 National Route 15 
 National Highway 15 
 A15 
Branxton – Beresfield:
 National Route 15 
 National Highway 15 
 A15 
 A43 
Beresfield – Hexham:
 National Route 15 
 National Highway 15 
 National Highway 1 
 A1 
 A43

Major junctions

Cities and towns

New South Wales

Singleton
Muswellbrook
Scone
Tamworth
Armidale
Glen Innes
Tenterfield

Queensland
Wallangarra
Stanthorpe
Warwick
Toowoomba

See also

 Highways in Australia
 List of highways in New South Wales
 List of highways in Queensland
 Moonbi Range
 Hunter Expressway
 List of highways numbered 85

References

External links

New England Highway

Highways in Australia
Highways in Queensland
Maitland, New South Wales
Newcastle, New South Wales
Roads in the Hunter Region
Toowoomba
Warwick, Queensland
Stanthorpe, Queensland
Tamworth Regional Council
New England (New South Wales)
Liverpool Plains Shire